Dangerous Man is the eighth studio album by American country music singer Trace Adkins, released on August 15, 2006 on Capitol Records Nashville. The album produced three singles on the Billboard Hot Country Songs charts between 2006 and mid-2007. The first of these, "Swing", reached number 20 while the second single, "Ladies Love Country Boys", became his second number one hit and his first since "(This Ain't) No Thinkin' Thing" in 1997. The third single, "I Wanna Feel Something", reached number 25 on the same chart. Overall, Dangerous Man is certified Gold by the RIAA.

Content
The track "I Came Here to Live" was previously recorded by Brad Cotter on his 2004 debut album Patient Man.

Critical reception

Thomas Inskeep of Stylus Magazine praised the album's collection of country party tracks and soft introspective ballads that allow Adkins to show not only his brand of reckless attitude but also show honest sincerity where Songs About Me failed to deliver, concluding that, "Whether his tempo’s fast or slow, the subject matter lascivious or tender, the mood is consistent across Dangerous Man. It sounds like Adkins has finally nailed down who he is as an artist, and by all accounts, it’s not much different from who he is as a man (by all accounts): a good ol’ boy from Louisiana who’s fully embraced it, and found a set of songs that express it. In doing so, he’s made the most complete album of his career." Chris Willman of Entertainment Weekly was put-off by the album's mood-shifts between tracks either being endearing or salacious, but praised tracks like "I Wanna Feel Something" and "The Stubborn One" for finding the right balance, saying that "Both prove Adkins can grab us by our hearts and minds... when he's not so fixated on ogling rears or thumping chests." Jonathan Keefe of Slant Magazine heavily criticized the album for being one of the worst the Nashville music assembly line has to offer, with hook-less guitar-driven tracks and cornball ballads being delivered through Adkins' limited range as a performer, concluding that it "isn't awful in any of the creative or important ways that would make it truly dangerous, but in perpetuating every unfortunate, ugly stereotype of the genre, Dangerous Man is still an embarrassment."

Track listing

DVD extras
The "Dangerous Man" CD features a DVD that includes three bonus audio remixes of "Honky Tonk Badonkadonk": A country club mix, a 70's groove mix, and a eurofunk mix. The DVD also features three bonus music videos, for "Honky Tonk Badonkadonk", "Arlington", and "Swing". In addition, the DVD features behind-the-scenes footage and access to ringtones.

Personnel 
Adapted from Dangerous Man liner notes.

Musicians
 Tim Akers - keyboards (5, 6, 12)
 Kenny Beard - background vocals (7)
 Casey Beathard - background vocals (7)
 Bekka Bramlett - background vocals (6)
 Mike Brignardello - bass guitar (1-4, 8-11)
 Pat Buchanan - electric guitar (1, 2, 4, 8, 9, 11), baritone guitar (3, 10), mandolin (8)
 Tom Bukovac - electric guitar (5, 6, 12)
 Perry Coleman - background vocals (5, 6, 12)
 Mickey Jack Cones - background vocals (7)
 J. T. Corenflos - electric guitar (1-4, 8-10), six-string bass guitar (1, 11)
 Eric Darken - percussion (all tracks)
 Chris Dunn - trombone (5)
 Paul Franklin - steel guitar (1-4, 8-11)
 Tony Harrell - piano (7), organ (7)
 Aubrey Haynie - fiddle (1-3, 8-11), mandolin (4)
 Wes Hightower - background vocals (1-4, 8-11)
 Jim Horn - baritone saxophone (1), tenor saxophone (1)
 Dann Huff - electric guitar (5, 6, 12)
 Mike Johnson - steel guitar (7, 8), Dobro (10)
 "The Ladies" (Emma Grandillo, Melissa Hayes, Morgane Hayes, Sandy Horowitz, Autumn House, Judy McDonough, Leslie Ann Parsons, Morgan Petek) - background vocals (2)
 Troy Lancaster - electric guitar (7)
 Randy Leago - tenor saxophone (5)
 B. James Lowry - acoustic guitar (2, 3, 8, 11), resonator guitar (9)
 Chris McHugh - drums (5, 6, 12)
 Greg Morrow - drums (1-4, 7-11), percussion (7)
 Gordon Mote - Hammond B-3 organ (1, 9, 11), piano (2, 3, 4, 8, 10), announcer (4)
 Russ Pahl - steel guitar (5, 6, 7, 12), slide guitar (7)
 Michael Rhodes - bass guitar (5, 6, 12)
 Rex Schnelle - electric guitar (7)
 Chris Stapleton - background vocals (4)
 Bryan Sutton - acoustic guitar (1, 4, 7), banjo (1, 4), mandolin (3, 10), gut string guitar (10)
 Quentin Ware - trumpet (5)
 Glenn Worf - bass guitar (7)
 Jonathan Yudkin - fiddle (6, 7, 12), mandolin (6, 7, 12), octophone (12)

Technical credits for tracks 1-4, 8-11
 Brady Barnett - digital editing
 Richard Barrow - recording assistant, overdubs
 Drew Bollman - overdubs, assistant
 Neal Cappellino - overdubs
 Tyler Moles - digital editing
 Justin Niebank - mixing
 Frank Rogers - producer
 Steve Short - assistant
 Hank Williams - mastering
 Brian "Loopy Dave" Willis - digital editing

Technical credits for tracks 5, 6, 12, 13
 Adam Ayan - mastering
 Drew Bollman - assistant
 Richard Dodd - recording
 Darrell Franklin - A&R coordination
 Mike "Frog" Griffith - production coordination
 Mark Hagen - recording, overdubs
 Dann Huff - producer
 Steve Marcantonio - recording
 Seth Morton - assistant
 Justin Niebank - mixing
 Mike Paragone - assistant
 Lowell Reynolds - assistant
 Christopher Rowe - digital assistant
 Aaron Walk - assistant

Technical credits for track 7
 Trace Adkins - producer
 Kenny Beard - producer
 Casey Beathard - producer
 Tony Castle - recording
 Mickey Jack Cones - overdubs, digital editing
 Billy Decker - mixing
 Mel Eubanks - assistant
 Rex Schnelle - overdubs
 Hank Williams - mastering

Visual
 Denise Arguijo - art production
 Kristin Barlowe - photography
 Joanna Carter - art direction
 Michelle Hall - art production
 Lee Wright Creative - graphic design

Chart performance

Weekly charts

Year-end charts

Certifications

References

2006 albums
Trace Adkins albums
Capitol Records albums
Albums produced by Frank Rogers (record producer)